The My Rapid Touch 'n Go is a contactless smart card used for the payment of public transportation fares of Rapid KL services in Malaysia, with limited use in the parking payments for Rapid KL Park N Ride facilities.

Introduced in July 2011, it is extended to   LRT Sri Petaling Line and  LRT Kelana Jaya Line in November 2011 as well as  Monorail Line in February 2012. Rapid Kuantan buses in Pahang adopted the MyRapid card in 2015.

Abolition
The My Rapid card was initially planned to be also accepted on the  MRT Sungai Buloh-Kajang Line once the Semantan-Kajang stretch opens. According to an announcement by Prasarana, the My Rapid card will instead be phased out and replaced with the co-branded My Rapid Touch 'n Go cards beginning 15 June 2017. The existing My Rapid cards will no longer be valid effective 16 July 2017, the day before the Semantan-Kajang MRT line is scheduled to commence operations. Existing My Rapid-based concession cards for students, disabled persons and senior citizens will also be replaced with the My Rapid Touch 'n Go-based cards.

My Rapid Touch 'n Go cards are sold, distributed and managed by Prasarana Malaysia Berhad.

References

2011 establishments in Malaysia
Payment card services companies
Contactless smart cards
Fare collection systems
Smart cards introduced in 2011